Edin Atić (born January 19, 1997) is a Bosnian professional basketball player for Budućnost VOLI of the ABA League and the Montenegrin League. Standing at 6 ft 7 in (2.01 m) and weighing 195 lbs. (88 kg), Atić is mainly a shooting guard-small forward, but he can also play as a point forward. He also represents the senior Bosnian national basketball team.

Early life
Atić was born in Bugojno, Bosnia and Herzegovina. Raised in Donji Vakuf, Atić started playing basketball with Spars Sarajevo. In 2013, he signed with Spars Sarajevo.

Professional career

Spars Sarajevo
In 2013, Atić signed a deal with Bosnian club Spars Sarajevo, of the Bosnian Championship. He stayed a member of Spars Sarajevo from 2013 to September 2015, when the Greek club AEK bought his player rights with a transfer fee. In January 2016, he returned to Spars Sarajevo, after AEK loaned him back to the club, for the remainder of the 2015–16 season.

AEK Athens
On September 1, 2015, Greek club AEK Athens, of the Greek Basket League, confirmed that Atić would join the club from Spars Sarajevo, for a buyout transfer fee amount of €750,000. Atić signed a six-year contract with AEK, that was worth €1.5 million net income. In January 2016, AEK loaned him back to Spars Sarajevo for the rest of the season.

Before the start of the 2016–17 Greek Basket League season, Atić managed to have some very good friendly games, including a 12-point game against the defending EuroLeague champions, CSKA Moscow. Due to this, AEK initially decided to keep him on their roster for the 2016–17 season, rather than loan him to another club again.

However, due to FIBA's rules and regulations of the FIBA Champions League, he was ruled ineligible to play in the league, because he was not originally registered for the Greek League as a foreign player in the league's first roster designation period. Due to FIBA Champions League rules, such players cannot play in the league, unlike European-wide leagues like the EuroLeague and EuroCup, where no such limitations exist. As a result of this, AEK decided to loan him to another club for the 2016–17 season. With AEK, he won the Greek Cup's, 2018 edition, and also the FIBA Champions League title. On July 14, 2018, Atić was released by the Greek club.

Trikala Aries
On November 2, 2016, AEK loaned Atić to the Greek club Trikala Aries, for the remainder of the 2016–17 season. However, after playing with Trikala in 7 games during the 2016–17 Greek Basket League season, his player loan was cancelled, and he returned to AEK.

National team career

Bosnian junior national team
Atić played at the 2014 FIBA Europe Under-18 Championship with the Bosnian Under-18 junior national team, averaging 16.0 points, 5.2 rebounds, and 2.4 assists per game. He also played at the 2015 FIBA Europe Under-18 Championship, where he led his team in scoring, at 16.0 points per game. He also averaged 7.6 rebounds and 3.8 assists per game during the tournament. His team finished the tournament in 4th place, and Atić was named to the All-Tournament Team.

He also played at the 2nd-tier level 2016 FIBA Europe Under-20 Championship Division B tournament, where he averaged 12.1 points, 7.1 rebounds, and 6.1 assists per game.

Bosnian senior national team
Atić is a member of the senior men's Bosnian national basketball team. With Bosnia, he played at the 2019 FIBA World Cup European qualification.

Career statistics

Domestic Leagues

Regular season

|-
| 2016–17
| style="text-align:left;"| Trikala
| align=center | GBL
| 7 || 6.4 || .357 || .167 || 1.000 || 1.4 || 0.4 || 0.3 || 0.0 || 1.9
|-
| 2017–18
| style="text-align:left;"| A.E.K.
| align=center | GBL
| 13 || 9.5 || .520 || .300 || .571 || 1.7 || 1.1 || 0.2 || 0.0 || 2.5
|-
| 2018–19
| style="text-align:left;"| Mega Basket
| align=center | ABA
| 20 || 19.5 || .397 || .343 || .553 || 4.9 || 2.2 || 1.4 || 0.3 || 8.3
|}

FIBA Champions League

|-
| style="text-align:left;background:#AFE6BA;" | 2017–18†
| style="text-align:left;" | A.E.K.
| 7 || 9.1 || .588 || .000 || .500 || 1.9 || .3 || .3 || .0 || 3.0
|}

Awards and accomplishments

Pro career
FIBA Champions League Champion: (2018)
Greek Cup Winner: 2018

Bosnian junior national team
2015 FIBA Europe Under-18 Championship: All-Tournament Team

References

External links
Edin Atić at fiba.com
Edin Atić at fibaeurope.com
Edin Atić at eurocupbasketball.com
Edin Atić at eurobasket.com
Edin Atić at baskethotel.com (Greek League )  
Edin Atić at esake.gr (Greek League )  
Edin Atić at draftexpress.com
Edin Atić at nbadraft.net

1997 births
People from Bugojno
Living people
ABA League players
AEK B.C. players
Aries Trikala B.C. players
Basketball League of Serbia players
Bosnia and Herzegovina men's basketball players
Bosnia and Herzegovina expatriate basketball people in Greece
Bosnia and Herzegovina expatriate basketball people in Serbia
KK Budućnost players
KK Igokea players
KK Mega Basket players
OKK Spars players
Small forwards